The Gadget is a young adult historical novel written by Paul Zindel published in 2001 by Random House and the final book of "The Zone Unknown" series. It tells the story of a 13-year-old boy named Stephen Orr, whose father is a physicist working on a covert project to develop the atomic bomb.

Plot
In 1945, 13-year-old Stephen Orr has just reached the gates of the top secret military base in Los Alamos, New Mexico. He has come to join his father, a physicist working on making an atomic bomb.  Though his father is forbidden to discuss the project in any detail, Stephen can tell by his haunted eyes and shaking hands how worried he and the other scientists are. After a few weeks, Stephen finds that he cannot control his insatiable curiosity. Enlisting the help of his new friend Alexei, Stephen devises a plan to discover the true nature of "the gadget." But when he finally learns what it is, he also realizes another startling truth—that he has trusted the wrong person with the information and not only his life, but the lives of all Americans, could be in terrible danger.

References

External links
The Gadget on paulzindel.com

2001 American novels
Novels by Paul Zindel
American young adult novels
American historical novels
Children's historical novels
Novels set during World War II
Fiction set in 1945
Novels set in New Mexico
2001 children's books